Neodymium(III) bromide is an inorganic salt of bromine and neodymium the formula NdBr3. The anhydrous compound is an off-white to pale green solid at room temperature, with an orthorhombic PuBr3-type crystal structure. The material is hygroscopic and forms a hexahydrate in water (NdBr3· 6H2O), similar to the related neodymium(III) chloride.

Preparation 
The direct reaction of neodymium with bromine can create neodymium(III) bromide:
2Nd + 3Br2 → 2NdBr3

In the presence of carbon, neodymium(III) oxide reacts with carbon tetrabromide to produce neodymium(III) bromide.

Structure 
Neodymium(III) bromide adopts the plutonium(III) bromide crystal structure. The neodymium ions are 8-coordinate and adopt a bicapped trigonal prismatic geometry. The neodymium–bromine bond lengths are 3.07 Å and 3.09 Å.

Related compounds 
Neodymium(III) bromide forms compounds with hydrazine, such as NdBr3·N2H4·2H2O, which is a pink crystal that is soluble in water but insoluble in benzene, with d20°C = 3.2376 g/cm3.

References 

Neodymium compounds
Bromides
Lanthanide halides